Leave it to the Girls was one of the earliest Australian television series. Based on the American radio and television series of the same name, it aired on ATN-7 and GTV-9 starting March 1957. The Melbourne run ended in October that same year, but the series continued in Sydney into 1958. It was a televised simulcast of a Macquarie Radio Network series, reflecting how new television was to Australia. It was sponsored by Rinso laundry detergent, and hosted by Terry Dear.

Format and episode status
Essentially a discussion series, three women and two men answered questions, topics and problems submitted by viewers. Seven episodes of the television series are held as kinescope recordings by the National Film and Sound Archive, and are among the earliest surviving examples of Australian television (among the episodes listed includes the first episode). The archive also holds various radio episodes

References

External links

Nine Network original programming
1957 Australian television series debuts
1957 Australian television series endings
Black-and-white Australian television shows
English-language television shows
Australian television talk shows
Australian radio programs
Television series based on radio series